Google Moderator was a Google service that used crowdsourcing to rank user-submitted questions, suggestions and ideas. It was launched on September 25, 2008 and shut down on June 30, 2015. The service allowed the management of feedback from a large number of people, who could vote for questions they thought should be posed from a pool of questions submitted by others or submit their own to be asked and voted on. The service aimed to ensure that every question was considered, let the audience see others' questions, and helped the moderator of a team or event address the questions that the audience most cared about.  The service was nicknamed Dory internally by Google, a reference to "the fish who asked questions all the time in ''Finding Nemo".

Google Moderator was developed by Google engineers Dave S. Young, Taliver Heath, and Colby Ranger in their 20% time, led by project manager Katie Jacobs Stanton.

In December 2008, Google Moderator was used by the President-elect Barack Obama's transition team in a public series called "Open for Questions", in which they answered questions from the general public. The first series ran for less than 48 hours and attracted 1 million votes from 20,000 people on 10,000 questions. The second series ran for just over a week and attracted 4.7 million votes from 100,000 people on 76,000 questions. In January 2009, Obama appointed Stanton to the newly created position of Director of Citizen Participation.

Google Moderator was shut down on June 30, 2015 because the usage did not match Google's expectations. The site remained available as read-only until August 15, 2015, at which time it closed completely. Content will remain available for a minimum of two years via Google's Takeout tool. Since the shutdown, the term has been used to refer to Google Moderators, an advanced permission given to certain accounts to allow the user to monitor certain aspects of Google and take administrative action(s) when needed.

References

External links
 

Moderator
Bug and issue tracking software
2008 software
Computer-related introductions in 2008
Products and services discontinued in 2015